C.S. Sovereign is a class DP2 type cable ship used for subsea cable installation and repair works. The ship was designed by BT Marine with Hart Fenton & Company as Naval Architects (now Houlder Ltd) and built by Van der Giessen de Noord in 1991.

C.S. Sovereign has four cable tanks. The vessel is equipped with two hydraulic powered drums  in diameter and four wheel pair haul-off gears.

Main cable works

 1992 – SAT-2 (CS Vercors laid the cable from Melkbosstrand to the first branching unit; C.S. Sovereign laid the remainder)
 1995–1996 – TAT-12/13
 1999 – ESAT 2 (Ainsdale Sands, England – Dublin, Ireland)
 2006 – Estlink (power cable)
 2008 – BT LIBERTY (Guernsey–England)
 2008 – NORTHERN LIGHTS (Dunnet Bay, Scotland – Skaill, Orkney Islands)
 2009 – HANNIBAL (Kelibia, Tunisia – Mazara del Vallo, Italy)
 2010 - SGSCS (Port of Spain, Trinidad - Georgetown, Guyana - Paramaribo, Suriname)
 2010 - EMEC (power cable installation for various tidal and wave generators in Orkney Islands, Scotland)
 2010/2011 - JUDY (power/fibre cable installation between oil/gas platforms in the North Sea)

References

British Telecom buildings and structures
Cable ships of the United Kingdom
Ships built in the Netherlands
1991 ships